Wilmington Downs is a  biological Site of Special Scientific Interest north-west of Eastbourne in East Sussex. The site includes a Scheduled Monument, the Long Man of Wilmington, a turf cut figure which may be of prehistoric origin.

This site is mainly chalk grassland on the steep slope of the South Downs. It is important for invertebrates, including two protected under Schedule 5 of the Wildlife and Countryside Act, 1981, the wart-biter grasshopper and the snail Monacha cartusiana. There are also several unusual species of lichens and mosses.

References

Sites of Special Scientific Interest in East Sussex